Sea Hunt is an American action adventure television series that aired in syndication from 1958 to 1961 and was popular for decades afterwards. The series originally aired for four seasons, with 155 episodes produced. It stars Lloyd Bridges as former Navy diver Mike Nelson, and was produced by Ivan Tors.

Development
Series executive producer Ivan Tors conceived the idea for Sea Hunt while working on the 1958 film Underwater Warrior. He tried in vain to sell the series to all three major networks, but each network passed on it because they felt that a series set underwater could not be sustained. Tors then decided to sell it into the first-run syndication market. He teamed up with Ziv Television Programs and was able to sell it to more than 100 syndicated markets before it debuted in January 1958.

Lloyd Bridges was cast as lead character Mike Nelson. Sea Hunt was intended as a comeback vehicle for Bridges due to his brief black-listing from acting. He was black-listed after admitting to the House Un-American Activities Committee that he had been a member of the Actors' Laboratory Theatre, a group that was tied to the Communist Party.

Bridges was given a crash course in scuba diving by Zale Parry and Courtney Brown, and Brown served as his underwater stunt double. Bridges was also educated in the art of scuba equipment by Brad Pinkernell on the beach in Southern California from 1956 to 1957 after a chance meeting when Pinkernell was coming out of the ocean with his scuba gear on. Over the course of the show's run, Bridges got more involved in the underwater stunt work, graduating from close-ups in the earliest episodes to doing all but the most dangerous stunts by the end of the series' run.

Synopsis
Mike Nelson (Lloyd Bridges) is a free-lance scuba diver, a former Navy frogman, who left the service about four years before the series begins, and member of the United States Coast Guard Auxiliary. He is a well-known expert on diving who is often called on for difficult or dangerous projects.  He travels on his boat the Argonaut and outmaneuvers villains, salvages everything from a bicycle to a nuclear missile, rescues children trapped in a flooded cave, and other such adventures. In the pilot episode, he rescues a Navy pilot from his sunken jet. No dialogue was possible during the underwater sequences, so Bridges provided voice-over narration for all the installments. Nelson also educated non-diving characters in various aspects of diving and the underwater world.

The series made frequent references to Marineland of the Pacific, which provided facilities, resources, and technical advice to the production company. At the end of each episode, Bridges appeared as himself to deliver a brief comment. These comments sometimes included a plea to viewers to understand and protect the marine environment, along with gems of wisdom from Bridges' own experiences. A number of notable actors appeared on the series early in their career, including Leonard Nimoy, Bruce Dern, Robert Conrad, Ross Martin, Robert Clarke, Larry Hagman, Larry Pennell, Ken Curtis, William Boyett, Jack Nicholson, and Bridges' own sons Beau and Jeff.

Production notes
Underwater sequences were often created during post-production from individual scenes shot at many different locations, including studio tanks and various underwater sites in California, Florida, and the Bahamas. Much stock footage was shot and later mixed with episode-specific character footage. Filming locations included:
 Marineland of the Pacific (Park operated 1954–1987)
 the front side of Santa Catalina Island, California
 Paradise Cove west of Malibu
 Silver Springs, Florida
 Cypress Gardens, Florida
 Tarpon Springs, Florida
 Nassau, Bahamas
 Grand Bahama Island
On-land location shots were filmed throughout Los Angeles, central Florida, Nassau, and on a sound stage. Famous divers such as Zale Parry and Albert Tillman were involved in production of the show, as was Jon Lindbergh, son of aviator Charles Lindbergh. Parry was joined in 1960 by 18 year-old Wende Wagner as a female underwater stunt double. Pioneering underwater cinematographer Lamar Boren shot nearly all of the underwater footage for the series. John Lamb shot the underwater sequences for both the movie and TV versions of Irwin Allen's Voyage to the Bottom of the Sea, and also filmed some episodes of Sea Hunt. Stunt diver Ricou Browning is credited with coordination of the underwater action sequences during the second season.

The boat used in the series was named the Argonaut after the mythological Greek heroes who sailed with Jason on the quest of the Golden Fleece. Several cabin cruisers were utilized in filming, and one notable model was the Trojan Express, custom built by Trojan Yachts in 1960 with mahogany planking and teak decks and trim, measuring 33 feet long and 12 feet wide. Diving equipment was supplied by Voit and a Navy depth gauge supplied by Sportsways, Inc. Wetsuits were made by the small Los Angeles shop Dive N' Surf, which was the genesis for Body Glove.

David Rose is credited with music, although a number of the Sea Hunt stock cues are heard in Buchanan Rides Alone, a 1958 Columbia western film that used stock music from composers including Mischa Bakaleinikoff, George Duning, Heinz Roemheld, and Paul Sawtell.

Reception
Sea Hunt proved to be popular with viewers and was a hit throughout its four-season run. It became one of the best remembered and most watched syndicated series in the United States. During the first nine months of its debut, it was number one in the ratings. The show attracted half of the viewing audience in 50 major cities and averaged 59 percent of audiences in New York City. Producer Ivan Tors later estimated that 40 million people viewed the series weekly.

According to New York Times writer Richard Severo, "Late-night comedians, especially Johnny Carson, used to tell jokes derived from the frequency with which Mr. Bridges, always fit and trim and looking forever like a slightly aging quarterback, was seen daring the fates underwater or emerging from the sea unscathed despite sharks, shipwrecks and assorted malefactors". Severo noted that TV Guide once described the show as "an epic so watery that Lloyd Bridges's colleagues tell him they have to drain their TV sets after watching his show".

Sport Diver Magazine wrote that Sea Hunt has had a "lasting impact" on the hobby of scuba diving, and cited a yearly event held in Florida called "Sea Hunt Forever" where divers don vintage gear and re-enact scenes from the TV series.

Cancellation
Despite its solid ratings, Sea Hunt was canceled in 1961 due to the dwindling first-run syndication market. The series ran for a total of 155 episodes.

Syndication
Sea Hunt went into reruns in 1961, and has aired on various channels since. The series currently airs on weekdays on This TV and Light TV, two classic television and movie networks carried on digital subchannels of local stations around the country.

1987 revival series
A revival series starring Ron Ely and Kimber Sissons appeared in syndication in 1987. Ely had starred in a companion undersea adventure series called The Aquanauts during the run of the original series. For budgetary reasons, land scenes from this second series were filmed in Canada (specifically Victoria, British Columbia), despite the stories being set in Florida. Underwater scenes were filmed in tropical locations.

The updated version of Sea Hunt was canceled after only one season.

Episode list

Merchandising
Due to the show's popularity, Dell Comics released a series of Sea Hunt comic books. Series star Lloyd Bridges also endorsed swim equipment by Voit.

Home media
TGG Direct released all 4 seasons on DVD in Region 1 on January 29, 2013.

50th anniversary
The Underwater Videographer Podcast presented a Sea Hunt 50th Anniversary podcast in December 2007.  Appearing on the podcast were author Eric Hanauer, who interviewed Lloyd Bridges shortly before he died, actress Susan Silo, who guest starred in the "Cougar" episode, and Jeff Bridges, who shared memories of his father and Sea Hunt.

See also

References

External links
 
 
 
 
 Sea Hunt Trivia Guide from The Scuba Guy
 "The Legend of Ivan Tors" documentary
 Sea Hunt comic strip

1958 American television series debuts
1961 American television series endings
1950s American drama television series
1960s American drama television series
American adventure television series
Black-and-white American television shows
First-run syndicated television programs in the United States
Television series by MGM Television
Underwater action films
Nautical television series
History of Silver Springs, Florida
Television shows set in Florida
Television shows adapted into comics
American action adventure television series
Underwater diving in mass media